Samuel Hidalgo-Clyne (born 4 August 1993) is a Scottish rugby union player who plays for Benetton Rugby in United Rugby Championship. His primary position is as a scrum-half.

Early life
Born in Jayena, Granada, Spain, Hidalgo-Clyne moved to Edinburgh at the age of three. He began playing rugby at primary school for Forrester RFC and continued there when he started his secondary schooling at the Royal High School. Having gained a scholarship, he attended Merchiston Castle School where he played as a stand-off before being selected as a scrum-half.

Club career
Hidalgo-Clyne specialised in international sevens for the 2011–12 season and joined Edinburgh's elite development roster in the summer of 2012.

Hidalgo-Clyne was awarded a place on the 2013 Macphail Scholarship to New Zealand.

Upon his return, Hidalgo-Clyne put himself in contention for a place in the senior squad and made his debut against Munster in September 2013. His first try for the club came in the opening minute of Edinburgh's 48–0 defeat of Benetton Treviso in December 2014. At the end of the 2014–15 season, Hidalgo-Clyne was named the Pro12 Young Player of the Year.

After seven seasons with Edinburgh, Hidalgo-Clyne left the club to join Welsh region Scarlets from the 2018-19 season. He left Scarlets early to join French giants Racing 92 in the Top 14 as cover during the 2019 Rugby World Cup Afterwards, Hidalgo-Clyne signed a short-term contract with Lyon until the end of the 2018-19 season.

On 17 February 2020, Hidalgo-Clyne agreed to move to Exeter Chiefs in the English Gallagher Premiership on a two-year deal from 2020-21 season.

On 3 February 2022, Hidalgo-Clyne would leave Exeter as he signs for Italy region Benetton on a three-year deal in the United Rugby Championship ahead of the 2022-23 season.

International career
Hidalgo-Clyne made his full Scotland debut on Saturday 7 February 2015, coming off the replacements' bench in a 15–8 defeat to France in the 2015 Six Nations Championship, and did so again in each of the remaining four matches.

Hidalgo-Clyne has also represented Scotland under-17, under-18, under-20 and Scotland Sevens.

References

External links

 profile on Edinburgh Rugby
 profile on Scottish Rugby

1993 births
Living people
Edinburgh Rugby players
Exeter Chiefs players
Forrester RFC players
Harlequin F.C. players
Male rugby sevens players
People educated at Merchiston Castle School
Scotland international rugby sevens players
Scotland international rugby union players
Scottish people of Spanish descent
Scottish rugby union players
Scarlets players
Racing 92 players
Lyon OU players
Benetton Rugby players